Pre-Emptive False Rapture is the second full-length album from the British experimental rock band Chrome Hoof. It was released in 2007 on Southern Records.

Track listing
All Songs Written By Chrome Hoof.
  "Nordic Curse"   – 1:56
  "Tonyte"   – 5:30
  "Pronoid"   – 3:48
  "Circus 9000"   – 4:40
  "Moss Covered Obelisk"   – 9:02
  "Leave This Ruined Husk"   – 3:45
  "Symbolik 180°"   – 2:46
  "Death is Certain"   – 4:21
  "Astral Suicide"   – 2:47
  "Egg N' Bass"   – 1:34
  "Spokes of Uridium"   – 8:07

Personnel

Chrome Hoof
Lola Olafisoye: Vocal
Andy Gustard: Guitars, Percussion
Emma Sullivan: Vocal, Keyboards, Vocoder, Trumpet, Percussion
Emmett Elvin: Keyboards, Synthesizers, Sampler
Chloe Herington: Bassoon, Sax, Percussion
Sarah Anderson: Violin, Viola, Percussion, Backing Vocal
Leo Smee: Bass, Synthesizers, Percussion, Backing Vocal
Milo Smee: Drums, Percussion, Synthesizers

Additional musicians
Tim Bowen: Cello
Lee Dorrian: Guest Vocals
Hannah Morris: Dancer
Nuwella Love: Additional Vocals

Production
Produced By Chrome Hoof & Harvey Birrell
Recorded & Engineered By Harvey Birrell
Mastered By Tim Turan

External links
[ allmusic link]

2007 albums
Chrome Hoof albums